Alagüney, Kepsut is a village in the Kepsut district of Balıkesir province in Turkey

References

Villages in Kepsut District